Anti-American sentiments in Korea began with the earliest contact between the two nations and continued after the division of Korea. In both North Korea and South Korea, anti-Americanism after the Korean War has focused on the presence and behavior of American military personnel (USFK), aggravated especially by high-profile crimes by U.S. service members, with various crimes including rape and assault, among others. The 2002 Yangju highway incident especially ignited Anti-American passions. Anti-American sentiments have served as catalysts for protests such as the Daechuri Protest, which challenged the expansion of the U.S military base Camp Humphreys. The ongoing U.S. military presence in South Korea, especially at Yongsan Garrison (on a base previously used by the Imperial Japanese Army from 1910 to 1945) in central Seoul, remains a contentious issue.  However, 74% of South Koreans have a favorable view of the U.S., making South Korea one of the most pro-American countries in the world.

While protests have arisen over specific incidents, they are often reflective of deeper historical, anti-Western sentiment. Robert Hathaway, director of the Wilson Center's Asia program, suggests: "the growth of anti-American sentiment in both Japan and South Korea must be seen not simply as a response to American policies and actions, but as reflective of deeper domestic trends and developments within these Asian countries." Korean anti-Americanism after the war was fueled by American military presence and support for authoritarian rule under Park Chung-hee, a fact still evident during the country's democratic transition in the 1980s.  Speaking to the Wilson Center, Katharine Moon notes that while the majority of South Koreans support the American alliance "anti-Americanism also represents the collective venting of accumulated grievances that in many instances have lain hidden for decades." Within the last decade, many Korean dramas and films have portrayed Americans in a negative light, which may also contribute to the harboring of anti-American views among Koreans.

Taft–Katsura Agreement

The Taft–Katsura Agreement (Japanese: 桂・タフト協定 Katsura-Tafuto Kyōtei) was a set of notes taken during conversations between United States Secretary of War William Howard Taft and Prime Minister of Japan Katsura Taro on 29 July 1905. The notes were discovered in 1924; there was never a signed agreement or secret treaty, only a memorandum of a conversation regarding Japanese-American relations.
Some Korean historians have assumed that, in the discussions, the United States recognized Japan's sphere of influence in Korea; in exchange, Japan recognized the United States's sphere of influence in the Philippines. However, American historians examining official records report no agreement was ever made — the two men discussed current events but came to no new policy or agreement. They both restated the well-known official policies of their own governments. Indeed, Taft was very careful to indicate these were his private opinions and he was not an official representative of the U.S. government (Taft was Secretary of War, not US Secretary of State).

This agreement evoked negative Korean reaction. Some Korean historians (e.g., Ki-baik Lee, author of A New History of Korea) believe that the Taft–Katsura Agreement violated the Korean–American Treaty of Amity and Commerce signed at Incheon on May 22, 1882, because the Joseon Government considered that treaty constituted a de facto mutual defense treaty while the Americans did not. The Joseon Dynasty, however, ended in 1897. In recent years, while the Taft–Katsura Agreement is all but an obscure footnote in history, the Agreement is attacked by some left-leaning Korean activists as an example of how the United States cannot be trusted with regards to Korean security and sovereignty issues.

Pre-Korean War

After the Japanese defeat in World War II the United States set up a self-declared government in Korea which pursued a number of very unpopular policies. In brief, the military government first supported the same Japanese colonial government. Then, it removed the Japanese officials but retained them as advisors. The Koreans, before the Americans had arrived, had developed their own popular-based government, the People's Republic of Korea, which is not to be confused with the Democratic People's Republic of Korea, the official name of North Korea. The popular government was ignored, censored, and then eventually outlawed by decree of the U.S. military government. The military government also created an advisory council for which the majority of seats were offered to the nascent Korea Democratic Party (KDP) which mainly consisted of large landowners, wealthy businesspeople, and former colonial officials. The military government, and this advisory council, set up elections for a legislature.

The elections were boycotted and protested throughout the country by the peasantry. The uprising was suppressed with police, U.S. troops and tanks, and declarations of martial law. The only representatives elected that were not of the KDP or its allies were from Jeju-do. Furthermore, the U.S.'s refusal to consult existing popular organizations in the south, as agreed upon at the Moscow Conference, and thus paving the way towards a divided Korea, embittered the majority of Koreans. Finally, pushing for United Nations elections that would not be observed by the Soviet-controlled north, over legal objections, enshrined a divided Korea, which the majority of Koreans opposed.

No Gun Ri massacre

In 2005, the South Korean government certified the names of 163 dead or missing (mostly women, children and old men) and 55 wounded. It said many other victims' names were not reported. Survivors generally estimated 400 dead. The U.S. Army cites the number of casualties as "unknown." Along with the My Lai Massacre in Vietnam, it was one of the largest single massacres of civilians by U.S. forces in the 20th century.

The civilian killings gained widespread attention when the Associated Press published articles in 1999 in which 7th Cavalry veterans corroborated survivors' accounts, articles that later won the Pulitzer Prize for Investigative Reporting. 7th Cavalry veteran Joe Jackman states, "there was kids out there, it didn't matter what it was, eight to 80, blind, crippled or crazy, they shot 'em all." The AP also uncovered warfront orders to fire on refugees, given out of fear of enemy North Korean infiltration. After years of rejecting claims by survivors, the Pentagon conducted an investigation and, in 2001, acknowledged the killings, but referred to the three-day event as "an unfortunate tragedy inherent to war and not a deliberate killing." The U.S. rejected survivors' demands for an apology and compensation. Inconsistencies with the Pentagon's investigation led to Korean War veteran Pete McCloskey (who had been brought in to advise on the report) state, "the government will always lie about embarrassing matters."

South Korean investigators disagreed with Pentagon findings, saying they believed 7th Cavalry troops were ordered to fire on the refugees. The survivors' group called the U.S. report a "whitewash." Additional archival documents later emerged showing U.S. commanders ordering the shooting of refugees during this period, declassified documents found but not disclosed by Pentagon investigators. Among them was a report by the U.S. ambassador in South Korea in July 1950 that the U.S. military had adopted a theater-wide policy of firing on approaching refugee groups. Despite demands, the U.S. investigation was not reopened.

Prompted by the exposure of No Gun Ri, survivors of similar alleged incidents in 1950–1951 filed reports with the Seoul government. In 2008 an investigative commission said more than 200 cases of alleged large-scale civilian killings by the U.S. military had been registered, mostly air attacks. More documents detailing refugee 'kill' orders were unearthed at the U.S. national archives and point to the widespread targeting of refugees by commanders well after No Gun Ri massacre. In August 1950 there were orders detailing that refugees crossing the Naktong River be shot. Later in the same month, General Gay ordered artillery units to target civilians on the battlefield. In January 1951, the U.S. 8th Army was detailing all units in Korea that refugees be attacked with all available fire including bombing. In August 1950, 80 civilians are reported to have been killed while seeking sanctuary in a shrine by the village of Kokaan-Ri, near Masan in South Korea. Other survivors recall 400 civilians killed by U.S. naval artillery on the beaches near the port of Pohang in September 1950.

Sinchon Massacre

North Korea claims that US forces massacred 35,000 people at Sinchon between 17 October and 7 December 1950.

The Geneva Conference of 1954

The armistice at the end of the Korean War required that a political conference be pursued where the question of a unified Korea would be addressed. Despite many proposals for independent national elections and a unified, democratic, independent Korea no declaration for a unified Korea was adopted. Some participants and analysts blame the U.S. for obstructing efforts towards unification.

Gwangju Massacre and alleged complicity

American Cultural Center arson

On December 9, 1980, in Gwangju, arsonists protesting the Gwangju massacre, burned the American Cultural Center (ko).

On March 12, 1982, arsonists set fire to the American Cultural Center in Busan. They killed one and injured several others. Moon Pu-shik and Kim Hyon-jang were sentenced to death but later commuted to life sentences and then to 20 years.

On November 20, 1982, arsonists fired American Cultural Center in Gwangju (ko) for the second time. In September 1983, Daegu's American Cultural Center was bombed (ko). In May 1985 in Seoul, American Cultural Center was seized.

On April 23, 2013, in Daegu, two anti-U.S. arsonists mistakenly attacked a cram school called the American Cultural Center.

Military prostitutes

During the early 1990s, former victims of forced prostitution became a symbol of Anti-American nationalism.
Former military prostitutes are seeking compensation and apologies as they claim to have been the biggest sacrifice for the South Korea-United States alliance. Some South Korean women report being encouraged to provide sexual services for American soldiers. As a result of this practice, some women were killed by soldiers or committed suicide. American military police and South Korean officials regularly raided clubs looking for women who were thought to be spreading venereal diseases, locking them up under guard in so-called monkey houses with barred windows. There, the prostitutes were forced to take medications until they were well.

Yun Geum-i murder case
Yun Geum-i murder case was a murder case on October 28, 1992, at a camptown in Dongducheon, Gyeonggi, South Korea. Bar employee Yun Geum-i, then 26 years old, was murdered by private Kenneth Markle (Kenneth Lee Markle III), a member of the USFK 2nd Division.

This case raised the issue of the U.S. Forces in South Korea as a social problem, and became an opportunity to start an earnest revision movement to U.S.–South Korea Status of Forces Agreement. Private Markle was sentenced to 15 years and he was imprisoned in Cheonan prison on May 17, 1994. He was released on parole on August 14, 2006, and returned to the United States.

Yangju highway incident

On June 13, 2002, a U.S. military vehicle fatally injured two 14-year-old South Korean girls, Shin Hyo-sun (신효순) and Shim Mi-seon (심미선), who were walking along a street in Euijeongbu, Gyeonggi-do. The incident provoked anti-American sentiment in South Korea when a U.S military court found the  soldiers involved, who were sent back to the United States immediately after the decision, not guilty. This prompted hundreds of thousands of South Koreans to protest against the U.S Army's continued presence.

PSY's anti-American performance

In 2002, PSY and some pop stars participated in an anti-American concert in response to the incident. PSY lifted up a model of a U.S. M2 Bradley armoured vehicle and smashed it, and rapped the song "Dear American". The song was written by a South Korean band to condemn the United States and its military for its role in the Iraq War. The anti-American lyrics saying, "Kill those fucking Yankees who have been torturing Iraqi captives and those who ordered them to torture," and "Kill them all slowly and painfully," as well as "daughters, mothers, daughters-in-law and fathers." In December 2012, he issued an apology to the US Military.

Apolo Ohno 2002 Winter Olympics controversy

In Salt Lake City, Utah, Apolo Anton Ohno emerged as a popular athlete among US fans for reportedly charming them with his cheerful attitude and laid-back style. He became the face of short track speed skating in the US, which was a relatively new and unknown sport at the time, and carried the medal hopes of America in that sport.  Ohno medaled in two events, although there was some controversy associated with the results.

In the 1500 m race, Ohno won the gold medal, with a time of 2:18.541. During the 1500 m final race, South Korean Kim Dong-sung was first across the finish line, but was disqualified for blocking Ohno, in what is called cross tracking. Ohno was in second place with three laps remaining, and on his third attempt to pass on the final lap, Kim drifted slightly to the inside where Ohno raised his arms and came out of his crouch to signal that he was blocked.  Fourth-place finisher of the same race, Fabio Carta of Italy, showed his disagreement with the decision saying that it was "absurd that the Korean was disqualified." China's Li Jiajun, who moved from bronze to silver, remained neutral saying: "I respect the decision of the referee, I'm not going to say any more." Steven Bradbury of Australia, the 1000 m gold medal winner, also shared his views: "Whether Dong-Sung moved across enough to be called for cross-tracking, I don't know, he obviously moved across a bit. It's the judge's interpretation. A lot of people will say it was right and a lot of people will say it's wrong. I've seen moves like that before that were not called. But I've seen them called too."

"Fucking USA"
"Fucking USA"  is a protest song written by South Korean singer and activist Yoon Min-suk. Strongly anti-US foreign policy and anti-Bush, the song was written in 2002 at a time when, following the Apolo Ohno Olympic controversy and the Yangju highway incident, anti-American sentiment in South Korea reached record high levels.

The Host
The 2006 South Korean monster film The Host  has been described as anti-American. The film was in part inspired by an incident in 2000 in which a Korean mortician working for the U.S. military in Seoul dumped a large amount of formaldehyde down the drain. In the film the dumped chemicals engender a horrible mutated monster from the river which menaces the inhabitants of Seoul. The American military situated in South Korea is portrayed as uncaring about the effects their activities have on the locals. The chemical agent used by the American military to combat the monster in the end is named "Agent Yellow" in reference to Agent Orange.

The director, Bong Joon-ho, commented on the issue: "It's a stretch to simplify The Host as an anti-American film, but there is certainly a metaphor and political commentary about the U.S." Because of its themes that can be seen as critical of the United States, the film was actually lauded by North Korean authorities, a rarity for a South Korean blockbuster film.

2008 US beef protest

Between 24 May 2008 and about 18 July 2008 in Seoul, mass protests were held in Seoul against the importation of American beef.

2015 attack on the USA Ambassador
At about 7:40 a.m. on March 5, 2015, Mark Lippert, United States Ambassador to South Korea was attacked by a knife-wielding man at a restaurant attached to Sejong Center in downtown Seoul, where he was scheduled to give a speech at a meeting of the Korean Council for Reconciliation and Cooperation. The assailant, Kim Ki-jong, is a member of Uri Madang , a progressive cultural organization opposed to the Korean War. He inflicted wounds on Lippert's left arm as well as a four-inch cut on the right side of the ambassador's face, requiring 80 stitches. Lippert underwent surgery at Yonsei University's Severance Hospital in Seoul. While his injuries were not life-threatening, doctors stated that it would take several months for Lippert to regain use of his fingers. ABC News summarized the immediate aftermath of the attack as follows: "Ambassador Lippert, an Iraq war veteran, defended himself from the attack. Lippert was rushed to a hospital where he was treated for deep cuts to his face, his arm, and his hand. ... [He] kept his cool throughout the incident."

During the attack and while being subdued by security, Kim screamed that the rival Koreas should be unified and told reporters that he had attacked Lippert to protest the annual United States–South Korean joint military exercises. Kim has a record of militant Korean nationalist activism; he attacked the Japanese ambassador to South Korea in 2010 and was sentenced to a three-year suspended prison term. On September 11, 2015, Kim was sentenced to twelve years in prison for the attack.

Since the mid-2010s 
Traditionally, anti-American sentiment in South Korean politics has been relatively more pronounced in the liberal-to-progressive camp than in the conservative camp. However, anti-Chinese sentiment has increased significantly in South Korea regardless of political orientation since the 2010s, which paradoxically led to a significant decrease in anti-American sentiment among South Korean liberals.

In the 2020s, political anti-Americanism in South Korea is mainly seen by 'some' left-wing socialists and far-left (NL) nationalists, while liberals and conservatives may be at odds with the United States in part, but basically support political pro-Americanism. Socialists and far-left nationalists in South Korea have never formed a mainstream political force.

General Security of Military Information Agreement (GSOMIA) issues 

As the Japan-South Korea trade dispute intensified in 2019, the Moon Jae Inn government attempted to destroy GSOMIA, a military exchange agreement between Japan and South Korea, which was signed in 2016 under the leadership of the United States. However, U.S. experts and politicians strongly criticized the Moon Jae Inn government, saying that the Moon Jae Inn government's decision to dismantle the GSOMIA would add to the North Korea's security threat to the South Korea. Eventually, GSOMIA was maintained due to strong U.S. pressure.

Some South Korean liberals criticized the United States for destroying South Korean sovereignty and deliberately ignoring issues related to Japanese colonialism. According to them, the United States treats South Korea as its slave-colony and 'forced' South Korea military cooperation with Japan for imperial purposes. They also point out that South Korea has the right to refuse all military cooperation with Japan because it is a sovereign state, and the U.S. should not criticize it at all. However, other South Korean liberals accepted GSOMIA (although they viewed military cooperation with Japan very negatively) considering maintaining friendly relations with the United States as a priority.

The Korean Confederation of Trade Unions is opposed to the U.S. 'forced' GSOMIA on the South Korean government. According to them, if the U.S. is indeed an ally of South Korea, it should only support the South Korean government's position of demanding compensation rights for victims and victims of World War II, not the 'war-crime states Japan' (전범국가 일본). They pointed out that if the U.S. ignores the proper anti-Japanese (반일) sentiment of South Korean people and U.S. forces South Korean government to do GSOMIA, South Korean people will be anti-American (반미).

Many South Korean liberals have anti-Japanese sentiment and pro-American sentiment at the same time. Soft anti-American sentiment in South Korea some liberals often stems from anti-Japanese sentiment. This is because the U.S. insist on cooperation between Japan and South Korea from the South Korean government. OhmyNews criticized the U.S. attempt to improve Japan-South Korea relations to check China as sacrificing South Korea, a victim of Japanese imperialism.

Indigenous nuclear weapon issues 
Since the 2020s, anti-American sentiment has emerged among supporters of indigenous nuclear weapons in the South Korea, mostly nationalist-conservatives. Anti-American sentiment among some conservatives in the South comes because the U.S. believes it cannot protect the South Korea from North Korean nuclear weapons.

See also

 Anti-Americanism
 Anti-Chinese sentiment in Korea
 Anti-Japanese sentiment in Korea
 Anti-Korean sentiment in the United States
 Axis of evil
 Busan American Cultural Service building arson
 Demonstrations at Yongsan Garrison
 Korean nationalism
 Progressive Party (South Korea, 2017)
 Sinchon Museum of American War Atrocities
 United States–North Korea relations

Notes

References

External links
 How the World Sees America videoblog: South Korea
 Yun Geum-i murder Incident
 주한미군범죄근절운동본부
 Kenneth L. Markle: Sadistic Murderer or Scapegoat?
 윤금이 씨의 피맺힌 교훈 (자주민보) – Murdered picture by a US Soldier

Korea
Anti-sadaejuui
Korea–United States relations
Military history of Korea
Murder in South Korea
North Korea–United States relations
Politics of South Korea
South Korea–United States relations

ko:반미주의#대한민국
ko:윤금이 피살 사건
ja:尹今伊殺害事件